Matthew Spear (born December 2, 1970 in Winston-Salem, North Carolina) is an American former soccer coach who is currently the President of the Richmond Kickers.

Spear attended Davidson College where he was a four-year starter (1988–1992) on the men's soccer team. He was captain of the 1992 squad that won the Southern Conference championship.

In 1993, Spear became an assistant coach at Davidson, moving up to head coach in 2000 when longtime head coach Charlie Slagle retired.  In 2003, he took the Wildcats to a 15–6–2 record and an NCAA post-season berth.  He was a Southern Conference Coach of the Year and has compiled an 85–84–11 record. On December 6, 2018, Spear stepped down as Davidson's men's soccer coach to be named President of the Richmond Kickers. Spear overlooked the Kickers during their 2019 and 2020 seasons. Following the 2020 season, Spear stepped down citing family reasons.

References

External links

 Davidson College coach profile

American soccer coaches
American soccer players
Davidson Wildcats men's soccer players
Davidson Wildcats men's soccer coaches
Living people
1970 births
Sportspeople from Winston-Salem, North Carolina
Association footballers not categorized by position
Soccer players from North Carolina
Richmond Kickers